The 2015–16 Western Kentucky Hilltoppers men's basketball team represented Western Kentucky University during the 2015–16 NCAA Division I men's basketball season. The Hilltoppers were led by head coach Ray Harper in his fourth season. They played their home games at E. A. Diddle Arena and were second year members of Conference USA. They finished the season 18–16, 8–10 in C-USA play to finish in eighth place. They defeated North Texas and UAB to advance to the semifinals of the C-USA tournament where they lost to Old Dominion. Despite having 18 wins and a better they .500 record, they did not participate in a postseason tournament.

On March 17, 2016, head coach Ray Harper resigned after three players were suspended by a university disciplinary committee. He finished at WKU with a record of 90–62. On March 28, the school hired Rick Stansbury as head coach.

Previous season
The Hilltoppers finished the season 20–12, 13–5 in C-USA play to finish in a tie for the second place. They advanced to the quarterfinals of the C-USA tournament where they lost to UAB. Despite having 20 wins they didn't play in a postseason tournament.

Departures

Incoming transfers

Class of 2015 recruits

Roster

Schedule

|-
!colspan=9 style="background:#F5002F; color:#FFFFFF;"| Exhibition

|-
!colspan=9 style="background:#F5002F; color:#FFFFFF;"| Non-conference regular season

|-
!colspan=9 style="background:#F5002F; color:#FFFFFF;"| Conference USA regular season

|-
!colspan=9 style="background:#F5002F; color:#FFFFFF;"| Conference USA Tournament

See also
 2015–16 WKU Lady Toppers basketball team

References

Western Kentucky Hilltoppers basketball seasons
WKU